Francis Otto, Duke of Brunswick-Lüneburg (1530–1559) was the Prince of Lüneburg from 1555 to 1559. He was the son of Ernest I, Duke of Brunswick-Lüneburg.

Life 
When Francis Otto took over the reins of power in 1555, he had to promise the interim government, that had ruled since the death of his father in 1546, that he would comply with a large number of constraints. His reign was dominated above all by the debts incurred by the principality. In 1559 he married Elizabeth Magdalene of Brandenburg, daughter of Joachim II Hector of Brandenburg and Hedwig of Poland, but he died in the same year of smallpox. The marriage was childless.

Sources 
 Geckler, Christa (1986). Die Celler Herzöge: Leben und Wirken 1371–1705. Celle: Georg Ströher. . .

External links 
 The House of Welf

Princes of Lüneburg
1530 births
1559 deaths
Deaths from smallpox
Middle House of Lüneburg